Viaje is the fourteenth Spanish-language studio album by Guatemalan singer-songwriter Ricardo Arjona. The album —the second independent release by Arjona after he was signed by Sony Music in 1993 and Warner Music in 2008— was released on 29 April 2014 by Arjona's own label, Metamorfosis. The album received a Latin Grammy Award nomination for Best Singer-Songwriter Album. The first single from Viaje is "Apnea", released on 4 March 2014.

Track listing

Charts

Weekly charts

Year-end charts

Certifications

See also 
 List of number-one Billboard Latin Albums from the 2010s
 Ricardo Arjona discography

References 

2014 albums
Ricardo Arjona albums